Jekadefari Area of Gombe State: is the combination of two different words "jeka" is a Hausa word meaning follow and "defari" meaning white. Jekadefari me "follow the white men". it was the area that white men settled then after they conquered the emir of Gombe in 1903.

History 
jekadefari was one of the oldest areas in central Gombe town, in Gombe State which is dominated by Yoruba as a result of the colonial masters that living in the area, that is most of the Yorubas in the area then follows colonial masters to the place and settled there. And other Indigenous peoples of Gombe State. it was marked as the Center of Gombe town not far from the emir of Gombe residents and the state government house. 

Due to the oldness of the area, the buildings in the area are made with clay and no town planning. hence no access to residence if not until the immediate past government Alh. Ibrahim Hassan Dankwambo created accessible roads to the resident's area
 

and also continue by the current administration of Alhaji Muhammad inuwa yahaya for proper access to their houses. however, it is the family house of the current governor.

Jekadefari has been a notable area where different state structured is such as the Gombe State School of Nursing and Midwifery,
Gombe

State Specialist hospital, Government Science Secondary School.

References 

History-related lists